Ragnar Hovland (born 15 April 1952 in Bergen) is a Norwegian novelist, essayist, poet, and writer of children's books.

Personal life
Hovland was born in Bergen to priest Håkon Hovland and schoolteacher Sigrid Indrebø, and grew up in Strandvik and Luster. He was married to Sabine Angelika Rolka from 1978 to 1992, and to Tove Olaug Bakke since 1996.

Career
Hovland made his literary debut in 1979, with the novel . The book follows four young boys from secondary school to college. Their interests circle around rock music, alcohol, a dose of politics and girls.

He followed up with the short story collection  (1981). The collection includes the stories "Dei siste beat-poetane i Midthordaland", where two wannabe poets are expelled from the gang and instead read their works for a herd of wet sheep; further "Sommarens blå flygel", where two young lovers are surprised by the boy's father, who expresses concern that they could catch a cold since they lie naked on the ground. In the surrealistic story "Songen om Emilia", a young man finds a dead body on the floor three days in a row, and is unable to get rid of the corps, even if he pushes them into the cupboard every time.

The novel Sveve over vatna (1982) is set in Bergen, and the protagonist is a student who gets involved in various strange adventures.

He was awarded the Brage Prize in 1992 for the children's book Ein motorsykkel i natta. He received the Norwegian Critics Prize for Literature in 2001, for the novel Ei vinterreise.

Awards 
Brage Prize 1992.
Norwegian Critics Prize for Literature 2001
Dobloug Prize 2008
Bastian Prize for Children's and Young-Adult Books 2008

Bibliography 
 About Ragnar Hovland
 Halvor Folgerø og Finn Tokvam Ler dei no, så har eg vunne: møte med Ragnar Hovland 2012

 By Ragnar Hovland
 Stille natt (novel) 2011
 Kunsten å komme heim og andre essay (essays) 2011
 Dr. Munks popleksikon (reference work / autobiography) 2008
 Fredlaus (children's and youth book) 2006, 2008
 1964 (novel) 2006, 2007
 Brevet  2006
 Verdt å vite (trur eg) (essays) 2002
 Norske gleder (essays) 2002
 Ei vinterreise 2001
 Psst! : kubanske notat (poems) 2000
 Åleine i Alpane 1999
 Halve sanninga. Tre versjonar 1998
 Detektivforteljing (Children's book) 1998
 Guillaume Appollinaire  1996
 Norrøne gudar  1996
 Dr. Munks testamente (novel) 1996
 Katten til Ivar Aasen møter hunden frå Baskerville (poems, Children's book) 1996
 Eline og Julie tar ferja (novel) 1994
 Ein dag i Sherwoodskogen (Children's book) 1994
 Bjørnen Alfred og hunden Samuel forlet pappkartongen (Children's book) 1993
 Over Bali og Hawaii (drama) 1992
 Ei lang reise (Children's book) 1992
 Ein motorsykkel i natta (novel) 1992
 Gjest Bårdsen døyr åleine ved Nilens breidd 1992
 Paradis (novel) 1991
 Novelleår (red.) 1990
 Konspirasjoner (essays) 1990
 Sjølvmord i Skilpaddekaféen (novel) 1989
 Mercedes (Young adult) 1989
 Skrivestadier 1989
 Utanfor sesongen 1988
 Love me tender (drama) 1988
 Emil og kaffikokaren (Children's book) 1987
 Sjømannen, tante Elida og dei største eventyr (Children's book) 1986
 Elefantmusikken (poems) 1985
 Professor Moreaus løyndom (novel) 1985
 Bussen til Peking (novel) 1984
 Jakta på Salamanderen (Children's book) 1983
 Under snøen (novel) 1983
 Sveve over vatna (novel) 1982, 1988, 1995, 2008
 Vegen smal og porten trang 1981
 Den flygjande sykkelen og andre forteljingar (Children's book) 1981
 Dei siste beat-poetane i Midthordaland (novella) 1981
 Det får stå til (Children's book) 1980
 Alltid fleire dagar (novel) 1979, 1978

References

1952 births
Living people
Writers from Bergen
Nynorsk-language writers
20th-century Norwegian novelists
21st-century Norwegian novelists
Norwegian children's writers
Norwegian translators
Dobloug Prize winners